Carlos Savage (1919-2000) was a Mexican film editor and actor. He is also one of the descendants of Benito Juarez. His father, Carlos Savage Juarez, is the grandson of former Mexican President Benito Juarez, who was also a cadet in Mexico's Heroic Military Academy, where he participated in the famous "Marcha de la Lealtad" or "March of Loyalty" of the Mexican ex-president Francisco I. Madero.

Selected filmography
 Rosalinda (1945)
 The Shack (1945)
 Ramona (1946)
 The Thief (1947)
 The Private Life of Mark Antony and Cleopatra (1947)
 Adventure in the Night (1948)
 Jalisco Fair (1948)
 A Family Like Many Others (1949)
 The Great Madcap (1949)
 Confessions of a Taxi Driver (1949)
 Angels of the Arrabal (1949)
 Desired (1951)
 Acapulco (1952)
 Snow White (1952)
 Chucho the Mended (1952)
 The Beautiful Dreamer (1952)
 The Vagabond (1953)
 The Sword of Granada (1953)
 Made for Each Other (1953)
 Hotel Room (1953)
 The Unknown Mariachi (1953)
 The Viscount of Monte Cristo (1954)
 When I Leave (1954)
 Bluebeard (1955)
 The Bandits of Cold River (1956)
 Pablo and Carolina (1957)
 The Boxer (1958)
 A Thousand and One Nights (1958)
 The Castle of the Monsters (1958)
 A Few Drinks (1958)
 Sonatas (1959)
 House of Terror (1960)
 Three Black Angels (1960)
 Alma llanera (1965)

References

Bibliography 
 Mayer, Robert. Eighteenth-Century Fiction on Screen. Cambridge University Press, 2002.

External links 
 

1919 births
2000 deaths
Mexican film editors
People from Mexico City